Shepherd is a census-designated place (CDP) in Yellowstone County, Montana, United States. The population was 193 at the 2000 census. Shepherd is a Billings suburb located to the northeast. The unincorporated town was named after R.E. Shepherd, a prominent early settler and owner of the Billings Land and Irrigation Company and the Merchants National Bank. The post office opened in 1915. 

The farming community is near the Yellowstone River.

Geography

Shepherd is located at  (45.943253, -108.344635).

Demographics

As of the census of 2000, there were 193 people, 71 households, and 51 families residing in the CDP. The population density was 181.0 people per square mile (69.6/km). There were 79 housing units at an average density of 74.1 per square mile (28.5/km). The racial makeup of the CDP was 94.30% White, 4.15% Native American, and 1.55% from two or more races. Hispanic or Latino of any race were 0.52% of the population.

There were 71 households, out of which 39.4% had children under the age of 18 living with them, 54.9% were married couples living together, 15.5% had a female householder with no husband present, and 26.8% were non-families. 23.9% of all households were made up of individuals, and 4.2% had someone living alone who was 65 years of age or older. The average household size was 2.72 and the average family size was 3.23.

In the CDP, the population was spread out, with 33.7% under the age of 18, 6.2% from 18 to 24, 29.5% from 25 to 44, 22.3% from 45 to 64, and 8.3% who were 65 years of age or older. The median age was 30 years. For every 100 females, there were 112.1 males. For every 100 females age 18 and over, there were 96.9 males.

The median income for a household in the CDP was $31,250, and the median income for a family was $45,500. Males had a median income of $17,500 versus $21,250 for females. The per capita income for the CDP was $13,025. About 31.0% of families and 28.2% of the population were below the poverty line, including 53.7% of those under the age of eighteen and 50.0% of those 65 or over.

Education
Shepherd School District educates students from kindergarten through 12th grade. Shepherd High School's team name is the Mustangs.

References

Census-designated places in Yellowstone County, Montana
Census-designated places in Montana
Billings metropolitan area